Bass Lake is a lake in Mahnomen County, in the U.S. state of Minnesota.

Bass Lake was named for the bass fish.

See also
List of lakes in Minnesota

References

Lakes of Minnesota
Lakes of Mahnomen County, Minnesota